Constantin Stănici (born 17 September 1969 in Bucharest) is a Romanian former footballer who played as a midfielder. His brother, Florin Stănici was an ice hockey player and his nephew, Andrei Cristian was a football player who played in the second league for Sportul Studențesc București.

International career
Constantin Stănici played one game at international level for Romania when coach Mircea Rădulescu introduced him in the 57th minute to replace Ioan Lupescu in a 6–0 victory against San Marino at the Euro 1992 qualifiers.

References

External links
 
 

1969 births
Living people
Footballers from Bucharest
FC Sportul Studențesc București players
Valur (men's football) players
Minnesota Thunder players
Kansas City Attack (NPSL) players
FC Unirea Urziceni players
Liga I players
Liga II players
USL First Division players
National Professional Soccer League (1984–2001) players
Nemzeti Bajnokság I players
Úrvalsdeild karla (football) players
Romanian football managers
FC Unirea Urziceni managers
Expatriate soccer players in the United States
Expatriate footballers in Iceland
Expatriate footballers in Hungary
Romanian expatriate footballers
Romanian expatriate sportspeople in the United States
Romanian expatriate sportspeople in Hungary
Romanian expatriate sportspeople in Iceland
Romanian footballers
Romania international footballers
Romania under-21 international footballers
Olympic footballers of Romania
Association football midfielders